Stygionympha vansoni, or Van Son's brown, is a butterfly of the family Nymphalidae. It is found in South Africa, in Northern Cape from the Kamiesberge to the Springbok area.

The wingspan is 36–38 mm for males and 38–40 mm for females. Adults are on wing from August to October. There is one generation per year.

The larvae probably feed on Poaceae grasses.

References

Butterflies described in 1953
Satyrini